Charles Stewart (1729–1800) was an officer during the American Revolutionary War and a Continental Congressman.

Early life
Charles Stewart was born in 1729 in Gortlea, County Donegal, Ireland to Robert Stewart. His grandfather, Charles Stewart, was an officer of dragoons and fought for William III of England at the Battle of the Boyne. Gortlea was given to his grandfather by William III for his war service. He emigrated to the United States in 1750 and pursued a career in agriculture.  After 1763, he lived at Lansdown, his mansion in Landsdown, New Jersey.

Personal life
Stewart married Mary Oakley Johnston (d. 1771), daughter of Judge Samuel Johnston (1706–1785), who owned a large estate there.

General Farrand Stewart Stranahan was his great-grandson.  Another great-grandson was Charles Seaforth Stewart.

Career
Stewart was commissioned lieutenant colonel of militia in Hunterdon County, New Jersey on April 10, 1771, and  commissioned colonel of a battalion of Minutemen on February 15, 1776. He served in four sessions of the Provincial Congress of New Jersey (1775–76).

After the outbreak of war, he was appointed commissary general of issues by the Continental Congress on June 18, 1777. Stewart later became a New Jersey delegate to the Second Continental Congress in 1784 and 1785.

Death
Stewart died June 24, 1800, at a farm he owned on Mt. Carmel (Coxe's Hill) in Flemington. He is interred at Old Stone Church in Bethlehem Township, New Jersey.

References

External links
 

Continental Congressmen from New Jersey
18th-century American politicians
Continental Army staff officers
1729 births
1800 deaths
People of New Jersey in the American Revolution